ICPSR, the Inter-university Consortium for Political and Social Research, was established in 1962. An integral part of the infrastructure of social science research, ICPSR maintains and provides access to a vast archive of social science data for research and instruction (over 16,000 discrete studies/surveys with more than 70,000 datasets). Since 1963, ICPSR has offered training in quantitative methods to facilitate effective data use. The ICPSR Summer Program in Quantitative Methods of Social Research offers a comprehensive curriculum in research design, statistics, data analysis, and methodology. To ensure that data resources are available to future generations of scholars, ICPSR curates and preserves data, migrating them to new storage media and file formats as changes in technology warrant. In addition, ICPSR provides user support to assist researchers in identifying relevant data for analysis and in conducting their research projects.

ICPSR supports students, instructors, researchers, and policy makers who:
 Conduct secondary research to support primary research findings or generate new findings
 Preserve and disseminate primary research data
 Study or teach statistical methods in quantitative analysis
 Write articles, papers, or theses to fulfill undergraduate or graduate requirements
 Develop funding proposals for grants or contracts that require a data management plan

ICPSR provides a number of tools as classroom aids for college-level instructors:
 Bibliography of Data-related Literature – citations to data from published works; a good starting point for literature reviews and research papers
 Social Science Variables Database – lets students learn by comparing variables across datasets
 Survey Documentation and Analysis online analysis package – allows exploration of data directly online
 Crosstab Assignment Builder – lets students create contingency tables from ICSPR data using an instructor-predefined subset of variables
Data Driven Learning Guides – enhance teaching of core concepts in the social sciences

A unit within the Institute for Social Research at the University of Michigan, ICPSR is a membership-based organization, with over 760 member colleges and universities and other research institutions around the world. A Governing Council of leading scholars and data professionals guides and oversees the activities of ICPSR.

While many of the datasets housed at ICPSR are provided to the public without cost, most require the data user to be a member of an ICPSR member institution or to pay a download fee.

The ICPSR data archive is listed in the Registry of Research Data Repositories re3data.org.

ICPSR Summer Program in Quantitative Methods of Social Research 
The founders of ICPSR believed researchers needed training to use the data the consortium was providing.

The first Summer Program was held in 1963 and was attended by 21 faculty members and 41 graduate students from member institutions. The program offered nine courses, with the most popular class, "Proseminar in Behavior Research Methods", attracting 46 participants.

The Summer Program expanded its offerings and participation over time. In 2015, the ICPSR Summer Program offered 81 courses addressing quantitative and analytic skills taught by 101 instructors from across North America and Europe. Participants included students, faculty, and nonacademic researchers from more than 40 countries, 300 institutions, and 30 disciplines. Due to the Covid-19 pandemic, the ICPSR Summer Program was held entirely online in 2020 and 2021.

The National Archive of Criminal Justice Data
The National Archive of Criminal Justice Data (NACJD), established in 1978, is a topical data archive located within the Inter-University Consortium for Political and Social Research (ICPSR), a unit of the Institute for Social Research (ISR) at the University of Michigan. NACJD is sponsored by the Bureau of Justice Statistics, the National Institute of Justice, and the Office of Juvenile Justice and Delinquency Prevention of the United States Department of Justice.

NACJD archives and disseminates digital data on crime and justice for secondary analysis. The archive comprises 2,500 datasets, including approximately 1,500 available for public use. NACJD houses several large-scale and federal crime data series, including:

FBI's Uniform Crime Reports (UCR)
FBI's National Incident-Based Reporting System (NIBRS)
Project on Human Development in Chicago Neighborhoods (PHDCN)
National Crime Victimization Survey (NCVS)

See also
National Digital Library Program (NDLP)
National Digital Information Infrastructure and Preservation Program (NDIIPP)

References

External links
ICPSR
ICPSR Summer Program in Quantitative Methods of Social Research
Institute for Social Research
ICPSRWeb's YouTube-channel

1962 establishments in Michigan
University of Michigan
Social research
Political research institutes
Educational institutions established in 1962